Too Tough to Die is the 1984 album by American punk rock band Ramones

Too Tough to Die may also refer to:

"Too Tough to Die", a song by heavy metal band Black Label Society from their 2005 album Mafia.
"Too Tough to Die", a song by Martina Topley-Bird from her 2003 album Quixotic
"Too Tough to Die", an episode from season 1 of CSI: Crime Scene Investigation.
"Too Tough to Die," A slogan for Lucky Brand Jeans